, son of regent Michiie, was a kugyō or Japanese court noble of the Kamakura period (1185–1333). He was the founding father of the Ichijō family, one of the five regent houses which monopolized regent positions in Japan's imperial court. He held regent positions kampaku in 1246 and from 1265 to 1267, and sessho from 1246 to 1247. Ietsune and Saneie were his sons.

Family
 Father: Kujo Michiie
 Mother: Saionji Rinshi (1192-1251)
 Wives and Children:
 Wife: Bomon Arinobu’s daughter
 Ichijo Ietsune
 Ichijō Saneie (1250-1314）
 Wife: Daughter of Ryosei
 Ichijo Moronaga (1258-1293)
 Jogon (1243-1299)
 Jisho (1260-1292)
 Jishin (1257-1324）
 Wife: daughter of Nijo Sadataka
 Ichijo Tadasuke
 Jigen（1260/70-1301）
 daughter married Ichijo Uchisane
 Junji
 Junsho
 daughter of Sono Motouji
 Ichijo Iefusa (1270-?）
 daughter of Taira Morishige
 Banshunmon’in (1268-1338) become Emperor Go-Nijo’s concubine

References
 

1223 births
1284 deaths
Fujiwara clan
Ichijō family
People of Kamakura-period Japan